John Leach is the name of:

John Leach (judge) (1760–1834), English judge
John Leach (Royal Navy officer) (1894–1941), Royal Navy captain
John Albert Leach (1870–1929), Australian ornithologist
Johnny Leach (1922–2014), British table tennis player
John Leach (MP), British Member of the UK Parliament for West Surrey (1832)

John Leach (footballer) (1866–1931), English footballer
John Leach (cricketer) (1846–1893), English cricketer
John Leach (studio potter) (1939–2021)

See also 
John Leech (disambiguation)